Łęczyca may refer to the following places in Poland:
Łęczyca, a town in Łódź Voivodeship
Łęczyca, Lower Silesian Voivodeship (south-west Poland)
Łęczyca, Lublin Voivodeship (east Poland)
Łęczyca, Bełchatów County in Łódź Voivodeship (central Poland)
Łęczyca, Greater Poland Voivodeship (west-central Poland)
Łęczyca, West Pomeranian Voivodeship (north-west Poland)